Louis of Nassau, Lord of De Lek and Beverweerd (1602 – The Hague, 28 February 1665) was a Dutch soldier. He was the illegitimate son of Margaretha van Mechelen and Maurice, Prince of Orange, and so a collateral member of the House of Orange-Nassau. He was a Lord of the heerlijkheid van De Lek (which he inherited on the death of his older brother, William of Nassau  on his death in 1627), as well as the Beverweerd Castle and its heerlijkheid from his father.

Career
He joined the army which had claimed his brother William's life and served with distinction in 1629 in the battle near Den Bosch. In 1632 he was advanced to Colonel and after 1635 was in charge of a regiment. In 1640 during the battle for Hulst he prevented the cannons from falling into enemy hands. In the same year he was sent to Paris to advise the French king of the forthcoming marriage of the 14-year-old William II of Orange to the 9-year-old English Princess Mary Stuart. Also, when the young Prince proceeded to England to fetch his bride, he was accompanied by Louis of Nassau. In 1643 he became General-Major and Governor of the city of Bergen-op-Zoom.

Despite his mother's objections he married Isabella van Hornes in the spring of 1630 and from this marriage ten children were born. Lodewijk was highly regarded by his uncle, Prince Frederick Henry, and took part in the Prince's family life.

Louis was originally a supporter of his next of kin, the Princes of Orange. After the death of William II he made his peace with the anti-Orangist regents of the cities of the Dutch Republic and worked with the administration of Johan de Witt, becoming First Noble of Holland. In 1658 Louis of Nassau became Governor of Den Bosch and in 1660 was sent as a special ambassador to England. In addition to his representing the Dutch republic, two of his daughters married British noblemen. Elisabeth married Henry Bennet, 1st Earl of Arlington, one of King Charles II's ministers; and Emilia married Thomas Butler, 6th Earl of Ossory, the heir apparent of the Duke of Ormond. By 1662 Louis had forged an apparently strong relationship between England and the Dutch Republic and returned to Holland where he died on 28 February 1665.

Marriage and children
He married Countess Isabella of Hornes in the spring of 1630, and had ten children.

He and Countess Isabella of Horned had three surviving sons:
Maurits Lodewijk I, Lord of De Lek (or LaLecq) and Beverweerd
Willem Adriaan I, Lord of Odijk, Kortgene, Zeist and Driebergen
Hendrik, Lord of Ouwerkerk and Woudenberg

He also had seven daughters of whom the three eldest were:
 Elisabeth van Nassau-Beverweert (28 December 1633 – 18 January 1718), a notable Dutch beauty, who married March 1665 Henry Bennet, 1st Earl of Arlington and had an only daughter
Lady Isabella Bennet (c. 1668–7 February 1723) who married 1 August 1672 as a four-year-old child Henry Fitzroy, 1st Duke of Grafton (28 September 1663 – 9 October 1690 d. at the storming of Cork), the illegitimate son of King Charles II of England and his mistress the Duchess of Cleveland. They have many descendants.
 Emilia Butler, Countess of Ossory, a notable beauty like her sister. She was wife of Thomas Butler, Earl of Ossory, and mother of the 2nd Duke of Ormonde and other children.
 Wilhelmina Anna, married the Dutch noble Albert Willemsz van Ruytenburgh (1630-1688), son of Willem van Ruytenburch, and had a daughter Anna Elisabeth van Ruytenbergh who married George Cholmondeley, 2nd Earl of Cholmondeley in 1701.

Louis of Nassau died in The Hague and was buried there, 6 March 1665, in de Great, or St. James Church. His descendants are buried in the family crypt at Ouderkerk aan den IJssel.

References

External links
 Leo van der Pas. Lodewijk van Nassau Heer van Beverweerd. Retrieved 7 October 2009.

References:
See: Reinildis van Ditzhuyzen, Oranje-Nassau: Een biografisch woordenboek, Haarlem 2004, 171-173 (with a portrait, ca. 1650)

1602 births
1665 deaths
17th-century Dutch military personnel
People from Utrecht (province)